Neelam Verma is the Founder of Integrity Dating. She is an International Speaker, TV Presenter, and former Miss Canada and Miss Universe finalist.

Biography
Neelam Verma is the Founder of Integrity Dating. She is an International Speaker, TV Presenter, and former Miss Canada and Miss Universe finalist. She has been featured in the media and as a speaker and expert on Mindvalley. Neelam teaches courses and has events to help people be more intentional in dating.  Neelam worked as at TV Presenter for media networks including CNN, ESPN, Discovery Channel, Rogers Media,TRT World, Quebecor. She won the Miss Canada title and was a finalist at the Miss Universe pageant, the first woman of Indian-origin to represent the country. She graduated from York University's Schulich School of Business and worked for Procter and Gamble and fortune 500 companies before working in media.

Career

Entrepreneur
Neelam is an entrepreneur and founder of Integrity Dating. She launched her company in 2020 to create a global movement in conscious dating. She teaches online courses and has global events that help people create meaningful relationships. She is an international Speaker and Conscious Dating Pioneer.

Television
Neelam worked as a Broadcast Journalist and TV Host for morning shows, news, entertainment and lifestyle shows in Canada, USA, India and the Middle East. She has interviewed celebrities, CEOs, New York Times authors, athletes and spiritual leaders. She trained with CNN International

She worked with TRT World in Istanbul as a Presenter, ESPN as a Host for "Premier Futsal" in India, on Discover Channel as a Host on "Daily Planet", on Sun News Network as a Morning Show Host on "First Look With Neelam Verma", with Rogers Media in Canada as an Entertainment Anchor for Bollywood Boulevard. 

She has been a Speaker and Presenter for the United Nations, Miss Canada Pageant, Mindvalley, and the IFFA Awards.

Miss Universe

Neelam won the Miss Universe Canada competition in 2002, becoming the first woman of Indian heritage to win the title. She represented Canada at the Miss Universe pageant in San Juan, Puerto Rico and was in the top 10 as a finalist. She hosted the Miss Universe Canada Pageant and was on the judging panel.

References

External links
 

1980 births
Canadian Hindus
Canadian people of Indian descent
Canadian television news anchors
Canadian women television journalists
Journalists from Montreal
Journalists from Toronto
Living people
Miss Universe 2002 contestants
Miss Universe Canada winners
Businesspeople from Montreal
Businesspeople from Toronto
Schulich School of Business alumni